Citadel Credit Union, headquartered in Exton, Chester County, Pennsylvania, is the fourth largest credit union in Pennsylvania. It is the second largest credit union in the Greater Philadelphia area. Citadel serves Bucks, Chester, Delaware, Lancaster, Montgomery, and Philadelphia counties with 24 branch locations in Southeastern Pennsylvania. It is chartered and regulated under the authority of the National Credit Union Administration (NCUA). Citadel offers banking, and retirement and wealth management. Citadel provides services to more than 200,000 customers.

History
Citadel was founded in 1937 in Coatesville, Pennsylvania by Lukens Steel employees as the Lukens Employee Federal Credit Union.

In 2001, Citadel partnered with the Chester County Intermediate Unit to establish the Citadel Heart of Learning Awards program. The program honors Chester County’s most outstanding teachers each year.

In 2005, Citadel acquired Atlantic Credit Union of Newtown Square, Pennsylvania. The merger grew Citadel to an almost $1 billion credit union.

In 2006, the NCUA granted Citadel the right to expand its charter into Bucks, Delaware, Lancaster, Philadelphia, and Montgomery counties.

In 2011, Citadel moved its corporate headquarters to Exton, Pennsylvania from Thorndale, Pennsylvania. The company continued to be ranked 2nd in assets among credit unions in the Philadelphia area.

References

Credit unions based in Pennsylvania